Asphodelus acaulis is a species of asphodel found in North Africa.

References

Asphodeloideae
Flora of Morocco
Flora of Algeria
Flora of Tunisia